Paul Lahaye (19 April 1902 – 22 April 1983) was a Progressive Conservative party member of the House of Commons of Canada. Born in Batiscan, Quebec, he was a farmer and life insurance agent by career. From 1922 to 1949 he was secretary-treasurer of his regional school board. Between 1945 and 1948 he was secretary-treasurer of the municipality of Batiscan.

He was first elected at the Champlain riding in the 1958 general election. After serving his only term, the 24th Canadian Parliament, Lahaye was defeated in the 1962 election finishing in third place behind winner Jean-Paul Matte of the Liberal party and Origène Arvisais of the Social Credit party. Lahaye was also unsuccessful in another attempt to return to Parliament at the Rivière-du-Loup—Témiscouata riding in the 1965 election.

References

External links
 

1902 births
1983 deaths
Canadian farmers
Members of the House of Commons of Canada from Quebec
Progressive Conservative Party of Canada MPs
Quebec school board members
People from Mauricie